Bairhanais a locality/township of Allahabad, Uttar Pradesh, India. The township of Bairhana is further divided into two localities: New Bairhana and the Old Bairhana . Near Bairhana chauraha is a medieval cemetery also called the "Gora Kabristan", where the dead bodies of British soldiers killed during 1857 revolt were buried.

References 

Neighbourhoods in Allahabad